This is a partial list of notable Polish or Polish-speaking or -writing actors.

A
 Piotr Adamczyk
 Aniela Aszpergerowa

B
 Alicja Bachleda-Curuś, Polish actress, born in Mexico
 Andrzej Bartkowiak
 Magdalena Boczarska
 Eugeniusz Bodo
 Wojciech Bogusławski
 Tomasz Borkowy
 Barbara Brylska

C
 Zbigniew Cybulski
 Mieczysława Ćwiklińska
 Elżbieta Czyżewska

D
 Ewa Demarczyk
 Dagmara Domińczyk

F
 Katarzyna Figura
 Małgorzata Foremniak
 Piotr Fronczewski

G
 Janusz Gajos
Karolina Gruszka

H
 Loda Halama
 Leontyna Halpertowa
 Adam Hanuszkiewicz
 Antonina Hoffmann
 Gustaw Holoubek

J
Krystyna Janda
Stefan Jaracz
 Josef Josephi

K
 Janina Klimkiewicz
 Jacek Koman
 Joanna Krupa
 Joanna Kulig
 Irena Kwiatkowska

L
 Bogusław Linda
 Tadeusz Łomnicki

M
 Maria Malanowicz-Niedzielska
 Izabella Miko
 Helena Modjeska

N
Pola Negri
Jacek Nieżychowski

O
Daniel Olbrychski

P
 Joanna Pacuła
 Ludwika Paleta, Polish-Mexican actress
 Dominika Paleta, Polish-Mexican actress
 Cezary Pazura
 Marianna Franciszka Pierożyńska
 Ingrid Pitt
 Roman Polanski
 Beata Poźniak
 Jeremi Przybora
 Anna Przybylska
 Wojciech Pszoniak

R
 Magdalena Różczka

S
 Izabella Scorupco
 Andrzej Seweryn
 Tadeusz Skarzyński
 Yvonne Strahovski, Australian television, film, and voice actress of Polish descent
 Jerzy Stuhr

T
 Stanisław Tym

U
 Natasza Urbańska

W
 Mia Wasikowska, Polish-Australian actress
 Jerzy Wasowski, Polish composer, pianist, and actor
 Roman Wilhelmi
 Lidia Wysocka

Z
 Zbigniew Zamachowski
 Michał Żebrowski
 Artur Żmijewski

See also

 List of Polish films
 List of Polish people
 Lists of actors

References 

Polish actors
Poland
Actors